The Descoberto River is a river of Goiás state in central Brazil. It forms the western boundary of the Federal District.

References
Brazilian Ministry of Transport

See also
List of rivers of Goiás

Rivers of Federal District (Brazil)
Rivers of Goiás